Brookside is a British television soap opera, set in Liverpool, England. The series began on the launch night of Channel 4 on 2 November 1982, and ran for 21 years until 4 November 2003. Originally intended to be called Meadowcroft, the series was produced by Mersey Television (now renamed Lime Pictures) and was conceived by Grange Hill and Hollyoaks creator Phil Redmond.

Brookside became very successful and was often Channel 4's highest rated programme in the mid-1980s, with audiences regularly in excess of eight million viewers. Initially notable for its realistic and socially challenging storylines, from the mid-1990s the show began raising more controversial subjects under the guidance of new producers such as Mal Young and Paul Marquess. It is especially well known for broadcasting the first pre-watershed lesbian kiss on British television in 1994, as well as a domestic abuse storyline resulting in murder. It also had the first gay character on a British TV series, who was outed in a 1985 storyline. In 1996, the series experienced an extreme backlash from viewers when it featured a hugely controversial storyline focusing on an incestuous sexual relationship between two siblings, and from that point onwards the show became notable for its more outrageous and improbable storylines.

Although the series had a long and successful run, its viewing figures were in terminal decline by 2000, and low ratings eventually led to its cancellation in June 2003. The final episode was broadcast on 4 November 2003 and was watched by around two million viewers.

The first episode of Brookside was repeated as part of Channel 4 at 25 on 1 October 2007. The episode aired on More4 in a season of celebratory Channel 4 programmes to mark the channel's 25th anniversary. Several classic episodes have also been available to view on All 4 since 2009. After years of campaigning by fans, the special DVD Brookside Most Memorable Moments was released in November 2012, just over 30 years after the series originally began. It features clips and episodes from the programme's 21-year history. In January 2023, STV Player signed a deal with distributor All3Media to become the first streaming service to provide every episode. Original cast members Claire Sweeney and Sunetra Sarker praised the decision to relaunch the show on STV Player.

Development
Brookside differed from other soap operas because it was filmed in real, brand-new houses in a real cul-de-sac, situated off Deysbrook Lane in the Croxteth area of Liverpool. Built by Broseley Homes, the houses were custom-built in an attempt by the producers to add to the show's realism. In early 1982, Mersey Television, with Phil Redmond at the helm, bought 13 houses altogether, six of which would be seen on-screen as sets. The remaining seven properties housed administration, post-production, and canteen facilities for the cast and crew. Redmond was particularly enthusiastic about purchasing an entire "close" of houses, partly as a means of achieving the desired realism of Brookside, as well as to maintain total control of his creation.

Characters

Narrative

Beginning
Brookside had a smaller ensemble cast than other soaps, eventually focusing on six households. The early cast featured just 16 characters and it would be a full 12 months before the six houses in Brookside Close became fully occupied. This was intentional, as Redmond wanted to reflect the pace of real life 'new-build' estate occupancy. Therefore, introductory episodes concentrated on the development of the anchor Grant family, with Sheila (Sue Johnston) and Bobby (Ricky Tomlinson) who had moved up the social ladder to a big, four-bedroomed house on the 'middle-class' Brookside Close from a run-down council estate. The Grants were the first family to have moved onto the close and they lived at number 5 and were the focus of earliest advertising campaigns promoting the programme. Initially, only three of the six new-builds were occupied by characters and Episode 1 saw the arrival of the Collins family led by Annabelle (Doreen Sloane), who is the first actor to be seen in the first episode, and Paul Collins (Jim Wiggins). In contrast to the Grants, the Collinses were on their way down the social ladder, downsizing from their lavish home on the upmarket Wirral, to the smaller, more modest, number 8 Brookside Close following Paul's redundancy. The contrast between the families was heavily featured, particularly Bobby's left wing and Paul's right wing views. Other characters included Heather Black (Amanda Burton in her TV debut) and Roger Huntington (Rob Spendlove), two young professionals residing at semi-detached number 9 who took an instant dislike to the Grants. Low class newly-weds Gavin (Daniel Webb) and Petra Taylor (Alexandra Pigg) moved into number 10 during very early episodes, memorably selling stolen cookers from the front lawn, infuriating their new neighbours.

The first episode was watched by 4.2 million viewers but the initial reaction to the serial was far from positive. Critics were quick to point out various technical problems as well as the profanity now being screened before the watershed. As viewing figures plummeted, stabilising at around 1 million, the production team and writers started to iron out Brookside teething troubles. Soundproof panels were placed on the ceilings of the houses to contain sound and eliminate echoing, and the scriptwriters toned down the language and removed a couple of poor performing supporting actors. The show's atmosphere changed with the arrival of new characters such as Alan Partridge (a character played by Dicken Ashworth and unrelated to the later comedy character of the same name) who moved into the bungalow (number 6) in April 1983, while pensioners Harry and Edna Cross (Bill Dean and Betty Alberge) bought number 7, arriving in November. Their opening storyline involved the mysterious movement of their garden gnomes. These new characters expanded the cast whilst helping to bring humour and balance to the existing cast during 1983.

Further cast changes during 1983 saw the arrival of the Jackson family. Both Gavin and Petra Taylor departed Brookside very early in the year. Gavin was the first casualty of the soap, dying suddenly from a brain haemorrhage in February – Petra committed suicide a few months later, having disappeared from the close in mysterious circumstances. Petra's sister, Marie Jackson (Anna Keaveney), her husband George (Cliff Howells) and their twin boys Gary and 'little' George (Allan and Steven Patterson) moved into number 10. They became central to one of Brookside's first high-profile storylines, when George was wrongly convicted of a warehouse robbery. In a bold move, the plotline was leaked to the tabloid press, and as Marie began the Free George Jackson campaign on-screen, the press followed, creating huge levels of media hype similar to those seen when US soap Dallas featured the 'Who shot J. R.?' plot in 1980, and Crossroads leaked the motel fire storyline in November 1981. Viewing figures rose as the hype continued; a record called "Free George Jackson" by Blazing Saddles was released, and merchandise was produced, including T-shirts and posters. Even though the storyline ultimately had a low-key conclusion (Cliff Howells resigned and George Jackson stayed in prison), the plot helped Brookside on the pathway to success, particularly when the Corkhills arrived to replace the departed Jackson family in September 1985.

Other early storylines included Alan's turbulent love-life and eventual marriage to Samantha Davies (Dinah May), Sheila's unexpected pregnancy in her forties, Paul's battles with unemployment, Edna's gambling addiction, Terry Sullivan's (Brian Regan) relationship with Petra's other sister, Michelle Jones (Tracey Jay), and his descent into petty crime along with Barry (Paul Usher). All the while, a strong political undertone was evident in the writing of Brookside earliest episodes and characters would often be seen debating political issues of the time.

Taking issue

Many of Brookside's early storylines were issue-led and strongly geared around the Grants' turbulent marriage. Bobby's short temper and frequent visits to union picket lines opposite Sheila's staunch Catholic faith and traditional family values made compelling viewing for many viewers, as did the antics of their children Barry, Karen (Shelagh O'Hara), and Damon (Simon O'Brien). The Jacksons, although a relatively high-profile family during the first two years of Brookside, departed Liverpool following inmate George's transfer to a different prison near Leeds in early 1985. Remaining sister Michelle departed soon after, leaving number 10 vacant for some time.

The Collins family at number 8 also had an eventful time. Nearing retirement, Paul suffered humiliation at his redundancy and subsequent unemployment, resulting in the family having to move to Brookside Close in the first episode. In another British soap opera first, a controversial storyline aired in 1985 saw their teenage son Gordon (originally Nigel Crowley, later Mark Burgess) coming out as homosexual when his copy of Gay Times was delivered to the neighbouring Corkhills by mistake. This made him the first openly gay character on a British TV series. The following year, Lucy Collins (originally Katrin Cartlidge, then Maggie Saunders) embarked on an affair with an older married man. During this time Annabelle became a magistrate and the main breadwinner.

1985 was a pivotal year for Brookside. Viewing figures had been steadily increasing since the popular Free George Jackson plot of 1984, but they rose to unprecedented levels in July 1985 during an extreme and hard-hitting siege storyline which saw three characters held hostage at gunpoint. At this point, the show was only in its third year and number 7 Brookside Close was then home to young nurses Sandra Maghie (Sheila Grier) and Kate Moses (Sharon Rosita), and former hospital porter Pat Hancock (David Easter). They rented the property from Harry and Edna Cross, who had moved into the bungalow next door after Harry had a serious angina attack. Through their nursing, they encountered John Clarke (Robert Pugh), whose elderly mother eventually died of natural causes in hospital, while under their care. Gradually, John's instability grew into insanity as he was unable to cope with the death of his mother, and he forced his way into number 7 armed with a gun and ready to avenge his mother's death. He held the three hostage for several days in a tense three-episode run with Brookside Close sealed off and surrounded by armed police. The siege culminated in three shots resulting in the death of Kate followed by John's suicide. Some critics took issue with the unlikely plot-premise; for example, Hilary Kingsley described it as "ludicrous" in her book Soap Box, while others were critical of the producers' decision to kill off Kate, the series' only black character. Viewers disagreed and ratings were pushed to over 7 million for the first time. This year also saw the death of Edna Cross, who collapsed from a stroke in the kitchen of number 6, just weeks after the siege. After Edna's death, long-time friend Ralph Hardwick (Ray Dunbobbin) moved into the bungalow to look after a devastated Harry. In September, Brookside's longest-serving family, the Corkhills, arrived. The first generation to appear in the close were Billy (John McArdle) and Doreen (Kate Fitzgerald), who moved into number 10 with their children Rod (Jason Hope) and Tracy (Justine Kerrigan). Stories involving the Corkhills were strongly concerned with marital problems and debt. With Billy languishing on the dole, Doreen struggled to raise money to support her desperate family. Doreen's interfering mother, Julia Brogan (Gladys Ambrose), followed the family and became a hugely popular comedy character, often dropping in to see her daughter at the most inappropriate moments. Julia remained in the series for well over a decade, long after her daughter and grandchildren moved on.

In 1986 storylines were just as hard-hitting, starting with a shocking and controversial sex attack on pivotal character Sheila Grant. Actress Sue Johnston's realistic portrayal of scenes showing Sheila coming to terms with her horrific rape experience and the impact this had on her family led to the storyline being named the second most popular Brookside storyline ever, as featured in the documentary Brookside: 10 of the Best,. Although Johnston went on to achieve even greater acclaim in the long-running drama Waking the Dead (2000–11) and as Barbara Royle in the hugely successful sitcom The Royle Family (1998–2012), when interviewed for the short Brookside: 10 of the Best DVD feature, Johnston confirmed that this powerful storyline is some of her proudest work ever as an actress. The second big storyline of 1986 was the death of Heather's second husband Nicholas Black (Alan Rothwell). Having divorced her first husband Roger in 1983, Heather reverted to her maiden name, Haversham, and returned to her career as an accountant. In November 1985 she met and quickly married Nicholas, but she was unaware that he was a secret heroin addict. Although Nick (as he was generally known) attempted to keep to his promise to his wife to give up heroin, the pull of the drug became stronger. After weeks of deceiving his wife to raise money for drugs (including stealing and selling her jewellery) he disappeared, subsequently dying of exposure in Sefton Park after overdosing on uncut heroin. As a result of this, and realising there was nothing left for her in Brookside Close, she left the series for good. The storyline was intentionally shocking, and made Brookside the first British soap opera to tackle the issue of heroin addiction candidly.

This year also saw the introduction of the soap's longest-running character Jimmy Corkhill, played by Dean Sullivan. Initially a bit-part player, Jimmy was the brother of Billy Corkhill. His early appearances usually saw the character in many moneymaking schemes, along with characters such as Barry Grant, Terry Sullivan and Thomas 'Sinbad' Sweeney (Michael Starke). Jimmy Corkhill's first high-profile storyline involved an insurance job on his brother Billy's house, whilst the Corkhills and most of the close were attending son Rod's graduation from police training. Another famous Brookside storyline occurred in November 1987 and involved Doreen and Billy's crumbling marriage reaching breaking point. When Doreen admitted to Billy she had been sexually propositioned in return to pay off the family's spiralling debts, in an iconic scene, Billy drove around the close, churning up his neighbour's gardens in a fit of anger, and a distraught Doreen walked out on her desperate family.

Following Heather's exit, Jonathan Gordon-Davies (Stephen Pinner) bought number 9, moving in with his fiancée, Laura Wright (Jane Cunliffe) in April 1987. Jonathan and Laura were both young professionals epitomising the 'yuppie' stereotype of the era and ostensibly filled the social demographic previously occupied by Heather. However, shortly after their marriage in August and following extensive character development in the scripts, Laura was soon hospitalised by an almighty electric shock after leaving the bathroom and switching on a brass-faced light switch that had been incorrectly wired by her father. Laura tumbled down the stairs, and went into a coma for three months, and Jonathan was faced with the impossible decision of allowing doctors to switch off her life-support machine in January 1988. Terry Sullivan then lodged at number 9 with Jonathan, and Terry's new girlfriend Sue Harper (Annie Miles) moved in soon after.

Peak of popularity

Late 1987 to early 1988 saw the rapid disintegration of the central Grant family. Damon was fatally stabbed whilst on the run in York with his girlfriend Debbie (Gillian Kearney) in November 1987 (and contained in a Brookside spin-off, see below). Karen left the show when she headed for London to study in late 1986, returning briefly in 1988 to visit her brother's grave, and again in 1990 for her mother's wedding. Bobby then left the close in May 1988 after he and Sheila grew apart following Damon's death. Later it was revealed that he was not Barry's biological father. As the Grants' marriage crumbled, destitute Sheila and her youngest daughter Claire moved into the spare room at Billy Corkhill's (number 10) after lonely Billy agreed to take them in. Number 5 was subsequently auctioned off and bought by the Rogers family during a moment of auction-fever in May 1989. The Rogers were a similarly large family like the Grants and moved into number 7 Brookside Close in November 1987 on the day of Damon's funeral, initially renting it from Harry Cross. The Rogers comprised truck driver Frank (Peter Christian) and his wife Chrissy (Eithne Browne) along with their three children Sammy (Rachael Lindsay), Katie (Debbie Reynolds, Diane Burke from 1989) and Geoff (Kevin Carson). One of the very early storylines featuring the Rogers' family involved Geoff's dyslexia. After experiencing reading and writing difficulties at school, mum Chrissy eventually uncovered his dyslexia, initially teaching him herself at home before getting proper specialist teaching for Geoff in school. This was the first time dyslexia had been tackled by a soap opera and helped to significantly raise awareness.

1989 saw the Rogers family become the show's central nuclear family. When the bigger, 4-bedroomed number 5 went up for auction, they decided to buy the former Grant house on their way up the property ladder. Many storylines revolved around them, including the bullying of Katie at school and a spectacular stunt, staged in October 1989, when Sammy and her boyfriend Owen Daniels (Danny McCall) were involved in a horrific car accident as a result of joy riding. The storyline was praised by then-Home Office Minister John Patten as "realistic realism" when highlighting the dangers of joy riding. As a result of the crash, Owen used a wheelchair and Sammy turned to drink, beginning the character's destructive descent into alcoholism.

Later developments for the Collins family included Annabelle having to rescue her elderly mother Mona (Margaret Clifton) from a corrupt nursing home where she was being mistreated. This was followed shortly after by Annabelle's affair with fellow magistrate Brian Lawrence (Vincent Maguire). Paul eventually found out about the affair, confronting Annabelle on Christmas Day 1988, and in the weeks that followed they worked at repairing their marriage. However, in June 1990, the entire family were abruptly written out of the series following Doreen Sloane's sudden death from cancer. The Collinses were among the few remaining original characters, and their sudden departures were heavily criticised.

Like the Grants, the Corkhills' turbulent marriage also ended in divorce and Doreen left the family in late 1987. 19-year-old Rod (Jason Hope) became a police officer and 16-year-old Tracy (Justine Kerrigan) trained as a hairdresser. Jimmy Corkhill, now a regular cast-member, was by now lodging at number 10 with his new girlfriend Kathy Roach (Noreen Kershaw). To make room for everyone, he created another room by knocking a doorway through to the garage, and it was this room that was eventually occupied by Sheila and Claire Grant. During 1989 Sheila and Billy grew closer, but the surprise return of Doreen, determined to win back Billy, caused big problems in their slow-developing romance, which became hugely popular with viewers.

In May 1989, a young professional Chinese family, the Chois, arrived at vacated number 7. Widower Michael (David Yip) moved in with his young daughter Jessica and before long, he embarked on a relationship with a colleague, scientist Alison Gregory (Alyson Spiro). Michael's sister Caroline (Sarah Lam) also moved in, providing storylines for the increasingly popular Sinbad, who was attracted to her. Sinbad had gradually risen from the ranks of occasional comic-relief character to a popular member of the cast, and his part continued to grow. He was eventually reunited with his estranged mother Ruth (Mary Healey), before finding love with Marcia Barrett (Cheryl Maiker) to whom he was briefly engaged.

In 1990, there was a near-wholesale cast turnover: Billy and Sheila married and then departed for Basingstoke, Jonathan Gordon-Davies left for London, the relatively new Chois emigrated to America and Harry Cross moved to St Helens. They were quickly replaced by a raft of new characters. The Farnhams bought number 7, the Dixons arrived at number 8, the reunited Johnson family settled into number 6, and Sue Harper married Terry Sullivan and they started married life at number 9 with baby Danny. The influx of new families had arrived in very quick succession. Max and Patricia Farnham (Steven Pinder and Gabrielle Glaister) moved into number 7 in September and were the soap's new 'professional' couple, along with their son Thomas, and live-in nanny Margaret Clemence (Nicola Stephenson). In direct contrast, working-class Ron and DD Dixon (Vince Earl and Irene Marot) drove onto Brookside Close during October in the 'Moby', a huge mobile shop, and moved into number 8 with their family, thus beginning a long-running feud between the two families which would last the rest of the series. Mick Johnson (Louis Emerick) had been a lodger with Harry Cross in 1989, but in early 1990 the character was joined by his estranged wife Josie (Suzanne Packer) and their children Leo and Gemma (Naomi Kamanga). Finally, with the rest of the Grant family gone, remaining original character of Barry Grant was developed and became increasingly involved in various dubious plots with the Liverpool underworld.

Even with the high cast turnover, Brookside was now achieving mass appeal and had become a hugely profitable and lucrative brand for Channel 4, as ratings continued to climb. The soap was by now achieving an average audience of around 7 million viewers (with the weekday and omnibus audience figures combined) and Channel 4 wanted more, introducing a third weekly episode from 1 July 1990. To accommodate this expansion, Mersey Television bought a defunct technical college in the district of Childwall, around 15 minutes away from the set of Brookside Close. The new headquarters came with a number of advantages, not least the fact that parts of the site could be used as different sets for their programmes, and part of this new premises became a row of shops called Brookside Parade.

Brookside Parade
The introduction of Brookside Parade saw Ron Dixon open a convenience store called Dixon's Trading Post, Barry Grant opened a bar/nightclub initially called La Luz, and Terry Sullivan opened Pizza Parade, where Matty Nolan (Tony Scoggo) and Owen Daniels worked for a while. Other businesses opened soon afterwards, including a salon run by Angela Lambert (Hilary Welles), a florist run by DD Dixon, a petrol station, and eventually a health club complete with swimming pool. These businesses meant that the main focus of Brookside shifted away from the houses and families of Brookside Close to this new, modern set – and many storylines went with it. To launch Brookside Parade in 1991, and coinciding with the soap's 1000th episode, the writers (now led by senior producer Mal Young) developed the controversial storyline of the double-murder of pregnant Sue Sullivan and baby Danny. The two were pushed off scaffolding, crashing through a glass canopy to their deaths, supposedly by lawyer Graeme Curtis (David Banks) in a grim 'whodunnit' plotline which saw ratings soar.

Billy Corkhill's children had remained in the series after his departure. Tracey became romantically involved with Barry Grant, leading to her aborting his baby, and Rod married Diana Spence (Paula Frances) and left the police force after being viciously beaten on his wedding night. The Rogers' divorced after Chrissy (Eithne Browne) walked out on the family to join teacher training college on Sammy and Owen's wedding day. By the end of 1991, Jimmy Corkhill (Dean Sullivan), had become a series regular and he played a central part in the show. He was joined by his estranged wife Jackie (Sue Jenkins), who appeared from 1991 working at Dixon's Trading Post, and his elder children Little Jimmy Corkhill (George Christopher) and Lindsey (Claire Sweeney) were initially seen as recurring characters. Jimmy was used to further explore the dark and devastating effects of serious drug addiction, beginning in 1993. The long-running story saw Jimmy descend into uncontrollable drug abuse, climaxing in a cocaine-induced car crash that killed Frank Rogers in November 1993. Teenager Tony Dixon (Mark Lennock) was also involved in the crash and eventually died in February 1994, sparking a feud between Jimmy and Ron that continued until the end of the series. Jimmy had taken part in endless fundraising with Ron's family in an attempt to help Tony recover from what doctors had diagnosed as a persistent vegetative state, but at Tony's funeral he could not hide his guilt any longer and he finally confessed to Ron.

By 1993, the firm establishment of Brookside Parade was complete and it was fully occupied by businesses owned by residents of Brookside Close. Flats above the shops also provided homes to various characters, including former resident Mick Johnson, who would later be held at gun-point in his flat by obsessed stalker Jenny Swift (Kate Beckett). Mersey Television made full use of its former technical college buildings in Childwall and writers introduced headmistress Barbara Harrison (Angela Morant), who moved into number 9 Brookside Close in December 1991 with her recently retired husband John (Geoffrey Leesley). Many scenes saw Barbara at Brookside Comprehensive (in reality derelict parts of Childwall Technical College), in charge of pupils such as teenagers Jacqui (Alexandra Fletcher) and Mike Dixon (Paul Byatt) from number 8, and Katie Rogers from number 5. The Harrisons' storylines included John's struggle with early retirement, his battle with asthma and his shoplifting sprees, and their son Peter (Robert Beck) became involved in a lengthy date-rape plot with Diana Corkhill. After a court case in which Peter was eventually found not guilty of rape, Rod left the close and divorced Diana, believing her rape was really consensual, adulterous sex. The Harrisons also left the close and were replaced by the Banks family, who arrived with much baggage of their own in January 1994.

The Body Under the Patio
One of Brookside's most famous storylines began in February 1993, with the story of wife-beater and child abuser Trevor Jordache (Bryan Murray). His wife, Mandy (Sandra Maitland) and daughters Beth (Anna Friel) and Rachel (Tiffany Chapman) moved into number 10 under a shroud of mystery. The house had been vacated by the remaining Corkhills and sold to a Mrs Shackleton; unbeknown to the residents of the close, she was acting as a representative for a charity supporting abused families, and had purchased the property as a safe house. After the Jordache family moved in some disturbing facts began to emerge. It transpired that not only had Mandy suffered years of mental and physical abuse, but also that Beth had been sexually abused by her father. Before long Trevor, who had recently been released from prison for GBH against Mandy, found them and persuaded Mandy to let him back into the family home, pretending to have been changed by prison, but once in he quickly resumed his old ways and frequently beat Mandy. Things quickly escalated as Trevor began getting violent towards Beth and began sexually abusing Rachel. As the abuse and torture got worse, Beth encouraged her mother Mandy to kill Trevor. After several attempts by the pair to poison him failed, Mandy stabbed him in the kitchen of number 10 and, with the help of Beth and Sinbad, buried him underneath their patio, where his body remained until January 1995, when neighbour Eddie Banks (Paul Broughton) dug him up whilst investigating a leaking water pipe. Following the discovery, Sinbad, who had genuine feelings towards Mandy and had been totally supportive and sympathetic of her plight, took the family on the run to the Republic of Ireland. This was depicted in a couple of episodes before they were arrested in Dublin as wanted suspects for murder. On return to Britain, Mandy and Beth were immediately charged with Trevor's murder, launching the Free the Jordache Two campaign and ratings soared with Brookside achieving its highest ever viewing figures of 9 million. The story was inspired by a real life case in Walsall, West Midlands, where a woman killed her abusive husband and buried his body under the patio of their house in 1990; it was discovered two years later.

The Jordache family, particularly Anna Friel's Beth, were among the most popular ever featured in Brookside and contributed massively to the soap opera's overall popularity at the time, especially when Beth shared the first pre-watershed lesbian kiss on British television with Margaret Clemence in January 1994. Mandy, meanwhile, developed a close relationship with popular Sinbad, eventually falling pregnant to him. However, in 1995, many viewers were disappointed with the conclusion of the storyline, when Beth suddenly died off-screen from a genetic heart condition whilst still in prison. In reality, Anna Friel refused to renew her contract and abruptly quit the role. Phil Redmond explained to disappointed viewers he felt the only way for Beth to leave Brookside was to die; he felt it would not have been right to leave the incredibly popular character languishing in prison. Once Mandy was finally acquitted and released, having won an appeal, she gave birth to Sinbad's baby (and named her after his mother, Ruth) but then moved to Bristol to work in a refuge for abused women, leaving unlucky Sinbad alone once again. The youngest Jordache, Rachel (Tiffany Chapman), remained in Brookside Close until the end, marrying Mike Dixon and giving birth to their daughter, Beth, named in honour of her late sister.

Decline
Following the huge ratings success of the 'body under the patio' and lesbian kiss plots, writers persisted with controversial, headline-grabbing subjects that other British soaps did not. Storylines progressively became more sensational in a fierce chase for high ratings. A religious cult headed by Simon Howe (Lee Hartney) brainwashed Terry Sullivan and Katie Rogers, taking over and then blowing up number 5 in a suicide pact during 1994, and a mysterious 'killer virus' saw the close quarantined and the deaths of guest characters George (Brian Murphy) and Audrey Manners (Judith Barker), and garage owner Gary Salter, in the middle of 1995. The arrival of the Simpson family in May 1996 and the quickly-established incestuous relationship between brother and sister Nat (John Sandford) and Georgia (Helen Grace) that drew the most substantial criticism – especially after their younger brother Danny (Andrew Butler) caught them in bed together. Channel 4 was forced to broadcast an apology to viewers who complained to the ITC about the highly contentious plot, and Phil Redmond was finally forced to admit "We got it wrong". After the shocking revelation, Nat and Georgia departed to start a new life in London and their father Ollie (Michael J. Jackson), who had been introduced ahead of the rest of the family as a friend of Mick Johnson's during 1995, threw their mother Bel (Lesley Nightingale) out after she had an extramarital fling with Mike Dixon, resulting in her catching a sexually-transmitted disease that she passed on to Ollie. Bel sought revenge by selling a story to the press falsely accusing Ollie of abusing Nat and Georgia as children, precipitating their incestuous relationship. The writers persevered with the remainder of the Simpson family, with Ollie meeting the Parade's new solicitor Eleanor Kitson (Georgia Reece), and she moved into number 9 with Ollie and Danny. Eleanor was found by her long-lost daughter Louise (Lisa Faulkner) and together they tracked down Louise's father, Marcus Sneddon. This storyline culminated in another hostage situation where Ollie, Eleanor, Louise and Danny are held at gunpoint by a deranged Marcus in a secluded hideaway, after which all four characters were abruptly written out and number 9 was sold to a returning Lindsey Corkhill.

Although the offending Simpson characters had been quickly dispatched, other characters were used in many similarly sensational and often unbelievable storylines, the overuse of which has been blamed for viewers' dwindling interest. Due to the popularity of Claire Sweeney, many storylines involved Lindsey Corkhill and her young daughter, Kylie (Hannah Dowd). In just two years, the character transformed from a single mother working in a chip shop, to a gun-toting, formidable bisexual gangster – a character change indicative of storylines now airing regularly in the show. During a continuous stint in the series between 1996 and 2000, Lindsey was stalked by her drug-dealing former husband, Gary Stanlow (Andrew Fillis), and resorted to hiring a hit man to scare him off. She was arrested at Bangkok Airport with Mike Dixon after vengeful Gary planted drugs in one of Kylie's teddy bears, developed an on-off relationship with an increasingly deranged Barry Grant before his 1998 departure, and entered into a very short marriage to philandering hairdresser Peter Phelan (Samuel Kane). There was then a lengthy stint where Lindsey became a brash, big-suited businesswoman terrorised by gangland boss Callum Finnegan (Gerard Kelly). With scriptwriters resorting to yet more plots involving Lindsey and guns, Mersey Television's publicity department, perhaps intentionally pushing the boundaries of credibility and good taste, issued pictures to TV listings magazines showing Lindsey waving a firearm in a provocative manner. Eventually, the writers calmed her down and turned her bisexual as she fell in love with new lesbian character Shelley Bowers (Alexandra Wescourt), who arrived in early 1999.

Mick Johnson (Louis Emerick) was one of the longest serving characters in Brookside, appearing from April 1989 as a lodger of Harry Cross at number 6. He originally worked with Terry Sullivan driving taxis, and they went into business together. During the early 1990s, Mick's character was expanded and he was given a free-spirited wife (Suzanne Packer) who regularly came and went, usually causing trouble along the way, resulting in Mick raising their two young children alone. The character eventually settled into life in the close at number 5, but endured relentless racism, several disastrous relationships, became addicted to steroids and suffered unemployment and depression – but it was a euthanasia storyline in 1997 that saw Mick shockingly facing murder charges. His new wife Elaine (Beverly Hills) had brought with her a terminally-ill mother, Gladys, and during the summer months of 1997 Gladys's health rapidly deteriorated as she begged her daughter and son-in-law to end her life. Eventually, both Mick and Elaine relented to her pleas and they smothered her as she slept. Mick and Elaine were both arrested on suspicion of murder, and following a bitter and acrimonious court case, Mick was eventually acquitted of Gladys's murder. However, his marriage to Elaine was over and they quickly divorced, with unlucky Mick becoming a single father once again.

Max Farnham, (Steven Pinder) was introduced as a young, middle-class professional businessman in 1990 and he had a turbulent residence at number 7 Brookside Close. Patricia (Gabrielle Glaister), his second wife, had breast cancer and had to endure the regular returns of Max's first wife, Susannah (Karen Drury), who was determined to win him back, bringing their two young children Matthew and Emily in tow. The Farnhams' original nanny, Margaret, also caused controversy when she began an illicit affair with DD Dixon's brother Derek O'Farrell (Clive Moore), a Catholic priest. Their next nanny, Anna Wolska (Kazia Pelka), was sacked and forced into prostitution. Patricia's parents David and Jean Crosbie (Marcia Ashton) moved into number 6 in 1993, and David took over the petrol station franchise on Brookside Parade. Jean and Patricia opened up The Gift Box and Max relaunched Grants, a restaurant on the Parade originally owned by Barry Grant. But after the birth of their second child, Alice, who was born with Down's syndrome, Max was arrested on suspicion of kerb crawling in early 1996. Although he wasn't guilty, Patricia refused to believe him and left him, taking Alice and Thomas to live in France. Her mother joined them soon after. Following a quick divorce from Patricia later that year, Max remarried his first wife, Susannah, and following the death of their two children, Emily and Matthew in an April 1997 car crash where Susannah was driving, they became involved in a lengthy surrogacy storyline with Jacqui Dixon (Alexandra Fletcher) after Susannah discovered she could no longer have children as a result of an infection caused by injuries sustained in the crash. Once Jacqui became pregnant, so did Susannah, resulting in two births nine months later. Max was then abruptly written out in 1998 when Steven Pinder decided to leave Brookside after almost nine years. His character's exit was unpopular and involved a retconned storyline where Max had supposedly had a 20-year-long affair with a woman called Faye, never before mentioned in the script. This was considered a lazy way to write out the long-serving character, and Max abruptly departed, so Susannah returned to her maiden name and, now a single mother of two babies, continued to live alone at number 7.

Like many of the families who came and went in Brookside, the Dixon family also ended in divorce after Ron (Vince Earl) had an affair with Bev McLoughlin (Sarah White), which ended his long marriage to his first wife Deborah "D.D" O'Farrell (Irene Marot) who then left the series. During the break up of Ron and DD's marriage, Bev had a one-night stand with Ron's eldest son Mike (Paul Byatt), resulting in the birth of Josh. Ron and Bev lived together for a while, renaming number 8 Cassa-Bevron. This was until Ron almost had an affair with his employee at the Trading Post, Jackie Corkhill (Sue Jenkins), and when Bev eventually found out, she set fire to Cassa-Bevron and fled the close in 1996. Ron then moved out of number 8 and rented it to Sinbad and his new girlfriend, Carmel O'Leary (Carol Connor), the mother of troublesome teenager Tim 'Tinhead' O'Leary (Philip Olivier). Later in 1999, Ron met and remarried an old flame, Anthea Brindley (Barbara Hatwell), the mother of his long-lost (and quickly forgotten) daughter, Megan, who looked identical to his Ron's other daughter Jacqui. Although initially happy and starting up their own successful business together, Great Grannies, this marriage also ended in divorce when Anthea refused to lie in court after Ron shot dead Clint Moffat (Greg Pateras) whilst being held hostage in the kitchen of number 8. This was alleged to be an act of 'self-defence', but resulted in Ron spending six months in prison. This storyline was based on the real-life case involving Tony Martin who shot an intruder on his property in an alleged act of self-defence.

The viewing figures for Brookside had been steadily declining since their peak in 1995 and although the series was certainly still popular, Phil Redmond dated the beginning of the decline of Brookside to 1998 and changes in the programming policy of Channel 4, which he claims began that year. Channel 4 chief executive Michael Jackson was reported to be concerned about the serial's falling ratings, which had by now dropped significantly to below five million viewers and was said to be considering cancelling and replacing Brookside. Attempts to boost ratings with explosions, shootings and underworld gangster storylines had also drawn substantial criticism from television watchdogs.

In response to the scathing criticism and falling ratings, there were attempts at a renewed and more grounded approach to storylining after the frenetic pace of the previous few years. Two new families arrived in Brookside's well-established tradition of rejuvenating itself by introducing an influx of new character-types with much baggage to unload. The Anglo-Irish Musgrove family arrived at number 8, renting the property from Ron Dixon, however, the Shadwicks, who bought number 6, were perhaps the more successful family introduced at around the same time. Greg (Mark Moraghan) and Margi Shadwick (Bernadette Foley) and their family marked an open attempt by the writers to return Brookside 'back-to-basics' with storylines again revolving around families and their dynamics within the close-knit community of Brookside Close. Phil Redmond commented in the book "Total Brookside" that the Brookside of 1998 was once again closer to the programme he launched in 1982.

The introduction of these two families also heralded one of Brookside's longest-running story arcs, which linked the two new families; the date rape of Nikki Shadwick (Suzanne Collins) at a Christmas party held at number 5, home of the Johnsons. For the whole of 1999, Nikki accused neighbour Luke Musgrove (Jason Kavannah) of the attack and he was arrested on suspicion of rape, however, following a lengthy court case, he was found not guilty. After this and consistently denying the allegations, Luke then confessed to Nikki that he had, in fact, raped her that fateful night. The Musgroves were extremely unpopular and were described as "ghastly" by critics, and with ratings continuing to slide, the entire family was quickly written out in January 2000 and they fled Liverpool overnight in shame at Luke's confession of rape. However, in another British soap opera first, the character of teenage cannabis smoker Matt Musgrove (Kristian Ealey) immediately transferred to Brookside's sister-soap Hollyoaks where the character stayed until 2004.

1999 also saw the brief return of Harry Cross, now with dementia and believing that he and Edna still lived in the bungalow. Sinbad (who Harry called "Popeye") and Jimmy Corkhill, the only familiar faces from his time on the close, looked after him until Harry's son Kevin (Stuart Organ) arrived to collect him and take him home to St Helen's.

Despite the attempts to return to being a more realistic and issue-led soap opera again, Brookside had ultimately become synonymous with plots involving guns and explosions, with no fewer than six catastrophic fires and explosions taking place during the soap's final few years. A gas cooker destroyed much of the Brookside Parade and left Ben O'Leary (Simon Paul) permanently paralysed in 1998, and a bomb detonated in the Millennium Club killed off both Jason (Vincent Price) and Greg Shadwick in 1999. Separate fires at number 6 (in 2002) and number 8 (in 1996) almost killed several characters. Susannah (Karen Drury) and Max Farnham's (Steven Pinder) children both perished in a car crash in 1997. Radio Times TV listings editor, Alison Graham, remarked in May 1998 when Ron Dixon blew up Brookside Parade by incorrectly installing a gas cooker: "Brookside loves a good disaster. Someone in the production team must take a perverse pleasure in watching blue flashing lights and fire engines". She also jokingly renamed Claire Sweeney's character: Lindsey "Get Your Gun" Corkhill, the character now having gained a stereotyped association with plots involving guns. This was shortly before the soap was dropped from Graham's satirical page reviewing weekly soap opera plots, with Brookside column handed over to BBC Radio 4 rural-soap The Archers. The series was becoming less and less popular and as viewers abandoned Brookside, so did the support of the TV magazines and press.

Revamp

In 2000, the Murrays, a likeable family, were introduced and moved into number 9. They were the creation of the soap's penultimate producer, Paul Marquess, who joined Brookside after working on Channel 4 and Sky One's co-produced supernatural soap Springhill (also set in Liverpool). The Murray family were an important and key part of another attempted revamp of Brookside that year and featured the popular singer Bernie Nolan in her first acting role, as Diane Murray, second wife of Marty (Neil Caple) and step-mother to Steve (Stephen Fletcher), Adele (Katy Lamont) and young Anthony (Ray Quinn) – Diane's mother, Bridget McKenna (veteran actress Meg Johnson) became a series regular at this time as well. The producers surprisingly revived some past characters and they brought back lovable loud-mouth Bev McLoughlin (Sarah White). Sammy Rogers' old school friend Nisha Batra (Sunetra Sarker) made an unexpected return, and a previous guest character, Leanne Powell (Vickie Gates), was reintroduced and she became the series new comedy character. Mick Johnson also had a visit from his long-departed former wife Josie (Suzanne Packer), although staying true to form, she didn't stick around for long, this time taking her daughter with her after Gemma's experimentation with the illegal clubbers' drug Ecstasy.

The return of the popular character Bev McLoughlin and the Murrays succeeded in sparking new viewer interest in Brookside and the Murray family became central to various plots, although many were considered retreads of previously explored issues; these included Diane's lengthy IVF treatment, daughter Adele's (Katy Lamont) under-age pregnancy and abortion, and young Anthony's (Ray Quinn) powerful bullying storyline, which culminated in Anthony accidentally killing vindictive schoolgirl Imelda Clough. Bev, meanwhile, became central to proceedings when she became the owner of the bar on Brookside Parade, renaming it Bev's Bar. The Liverpool 'scally' aspect, always traditionally at the heart of Brookside, was still strong at this time with eldest Murray son Steve (Steven Fletcher) teaming up with Tim 'Tinhead' O'Leary (Philip Olivier), who had married the rejuvenated character Emily Shadwick (Jennifer Ellison) who had been transformed from a shy, quiet, schoolgirl to a teenage, sexed-up vixen. Tim and Emily moved in with the increasingly isolated Jimmy Corkhill at cursed number 10, providing storylines for the character following the exit of his daughter Lindsey and his wife Jackie after a poorly received lesbian love-triangle involving Lindsey, Jackie, and Shelley Bowers. Of the unlikely storyline, Phil Redmond admitted things had gone too far; "NHS and child care – these are the things that engage and worry people in society now. The shorthand explanation is I'm giving up the lesbian-affair-with-the-mother-in-law syndrome. We've been there, done that and patented the T-shirt." But it was the departure of the soap's original scally, the hugely popular and truly long-running Sinbad (Michael Starke) in an on-screen child abuse scandal, that was most badly received. Although the allegations against Sinbad were proven false, many on the close refused to believe his innocence and the formerly upbeat and jolly character departed Brookside Close (after 16 years) under a cloud.

Although to a small degree Brookside's terminal ratings slide since its 1995 peak had been temporarily halted, plots started going around in circles before finally being resolved with Nikki Shadwick's date-rape storyline, Diane Murray's infatuation with pregnancy, and the long drawn-out breakdown of Jimmy and Jackie Corkhill's marriage being good examples of this. Another long term character, the notoriously accident prone Susannah Morrisey, was finally killed off when she fell down the stairs of number 7. This became a successful 2000 'Whodunnit' plotline which involved jilted former-lover Mick Johnson (Louis Emerick), vengeful Emily Shadwick (Jennifer Ellison) and returned former husband Max Farnham (Stephen Pinder) are all put in the frame when it is discovered that Susannah may have been pushed to her death. This was arguably the last time Brookside made a significant impact in the ratings, being pushed back up to over 6 million when Max was revealed to be the culprit, although a final twist was revealed in flashback; Susannah had actually tripped over a toy as she argued with Max at the top of the stairs resulting in the fatal fall. All murder charges were dropped, leaving Max free to marry his previous next-door neighbour, Jacqui Dixon (Alexandra Fletcher), who became his third wife in 2001. Max and Jacqui continued to live at number 7 where Max had resided with his previous two wives, before they swapped houses with Ron Dixon (Vince Earl) next door at number 8, where Jacqui had previously lived with her family. Mick Johnson, played by Louis Emerick for over 12 years, then fled the close after a suicide attempt, and Jimmy Corkhill descended into madness, eventually being diagnosed bipolar, but these were storylines which, to viewers and critics alike, obviously demonstrated the writers were running out of steam and there were serious questions about the lack of direction the soap was now heading.

20th anniversary
Brookside had been renewed in 1997 but the four-year contract renewal period ended in November 2001, by which point Paul Marquess left to become producer of ITV's long-running police drama The Bill. By this time, Brookside had become a far less important part of Channel 4's programming. Ratings had dropped to less than three million, and although regularly airing three times a week in prime time, sometimes double episodes were shown back-to-back and the audience could not keep up with the constant moves around the schedules to accommodate Channel 4's newer programming, including 'reality' shows such as Location, Location, Location, Property Ladder, Grand Designs, and to a much greater extent, the ratings powerhouse Big Brother, which started on Channel 4 in 2000.

During late 2001, following a failed attempt by Channel 4 to lure former producer Mal Young back to the series, Phil Redmond resumed total control of Brookside to take the programme through its 20th anniversary, and he pledged to return the ailing programme back to its former glory. At a meeting in which everyone from cast and crew were invited, Redmond announced "I'm back!" and that Brookside was going to be just like the "old days". The rather tired looking houses in Brookside Close received a much needed facelift; out went four established characters; in came new directors, new writers and new characters, including Ben Hull, a well-known face from sister-soap Hollyoaks as Doctor Gary Parr, and his demanding wife Gabby (Stephanie Chambers). Furthermore, after years of broken homes and waifs-and-strays making up the core-cast of Brookside, another new family arrived and the hard-working, middle class, Gordon family moved into number 5 in May 2002, which had been vacated by Mick Johnson. But, as Alan (John Burton), Debbie (Annette Ekblom) and their four teenage children settled into life on the close, also running the petrol station on Brookside Parade, the comparisons to the earlier and popular Grant family were obvious, but their arrival did absolutely nothing to halt the rapid ratings decline. The Gordons were considered miscast and generally unlikeable. Their eldest daughter Ruth (Lynsey McCaffrey) had returned home with her young son Luke (Callum Giblin) and new boyfriend Dan (Matthew Crompton) following her failed marriage to Sean Smith (Barry Sloane); meanwhile, the young teenage scallies Stuart (David Lyon) and Ali (Kris Mochrie) were regularly seen tormenting their other sister, Kirsty (Jessicca Noon), who had also returned home just as the Gordon's moved into number 5 after a stint travelling. Although the Gordon family arguably came with strong characterisation and a back-story, the most interesting storyline Alan received was his failed attempts to give up smoking, whilst Debbie was only ever seen moaning and tutting at her husband and four miserable children.

Just as Phil Redmond had promised in his vision of the new-look Brookside, characters were once again seen debating political and environmental issues of the time, and the Gordons were often seen discussing topics over the dinner table, much like the Grant family in the early years. However, critics on websites such as Off the Telly argued that the Gordons lacked any on-screen chemistry and this meant that scenes such as these were often forced and were viewed as contrived. Doctor Gary Parr's frequent criticism of the National Health Service was also seen as unnecessary.

A much more grounded approach to storylining had been attempted during 2002 along with the influx of new characters but the programme's ratings failed to pick up. As the serial approached its 20th anniversary, ratings dropped to below 1.5 million, and, as a consequence of this, it was announced that Brookside would no longer be aired during its weeknight prime-time slots but would continue in its traditional Saturday evening omnibus edition. Channel 4 was committed to Brookside contractually until November 2003 and this move was widely seen as damage limitation – the removal of the problem series from primetime would cease the channel's dwindling audience share and Brookside would quietly die playing out on Saturday afternoons. The announcement coincided exactly with the 20th anniversary of Brookside, and it was something of a blow considering the programme was celebrating the milestone on-screen a brand new look: a post-production film-effect was added, a new title sequence launched with an updated theme tune – and all this started with a highly dramatic multi-episode story arc that saw the return of Lindsey Corkhill for a guest stint, not surprisingly arriving just as armed drug dealers sped onto the close, hotly pursued by police.

The November 2002 anniversary siege began with four armed drug dealers, having taken a wrong turn, cornered in the small cul-de-sac. In desperation, they raided some houses on the close to take cover and took many residents hostage in their homes. These were highly graphic and violent scenes and signalled the end of the relatively low-key, character-led storylines of 2002 – these highly dramatic episodes were designed to shock: in the storyline, teenagers Ali and Kirsty Gordon were violently terrorised at gunpoint in number 5, Steve Murray was shot and dumped unconscious outside the front door of number 9, Nikki Shadwick was almost raped (again), and her sister, Emily O'Leary, fell to her death from an upstairs window of number 10, terrified and desperately trying to escape. Marty Murray was beaten and locked in a cupboard, there was the implied rape of Kirsty Gordon, blatant abuse of the drug cocaine, extremely strong language, and a realistic portrayal of a deranged, drug addicted bank robber called Terry 'Psycho' Gibson by Greg Milburn. The siege ran over several episodes and culminated the following week in a spectacular stunt involving a police helicopter which was gunned down by Gibson and then spectacularly crashed onto the Brookside Parade car park, exploded, and instantly killed off the popular character Diane Murray. The stunt was vaguely reminiscent of the plane crash storyline in Emmerdale, which Redmond had himself devised for that flagging series in 1993, with the storyline now praised as saving the series from cancellation. However, the helicopter crash could not save Brookside and the storyline was ultimately criticised as being completely unrealistic and ultimately unsuitable for pre-watershed viewing and, in particular, during the Saturday evening omnibus, broadcast from 16:30. The storyline did, however, provide some extremely dramatic sequences, were well acted and were technically of a high quality, but with no promotion whatsoever by Channel 4, they barely made a ripple in the ratings.

Final year

On 30 November 2002, Brookside quietly transferred to its new 'graveyard' Saturday afternoon slot, typically starting at around 4:00 pm, and the programme was optimistically retooled to fit the new 90-minute daytime only slot. With an obviously significantly reduced budget, storylines would now revolve around only a handful of characters, often in just one location, giving the programme a much slower pace. Brookside Parade was phased out of the storyline, the entire set handed over to Hollyoaks to become the students' university bar. The recently introduced Gordon family started to be written out and the abrupt disappearance and eventual death of Alan in the 2002 siege aftermath, followed shortly after by Debbie dying in an unconvincing car crash, gave the remaining family a depressive on-screen presence. With long, 90 minute episodes featuring endless scenes of shouting, arguing and crying as the Gordon children dealt with the reality of becoming orphans, it became impossible for viewers to have sympathy for the unpopular characters that had been poorly integrated into the series and been given very little to do. Other characters slowly drifted away with little or no explanation, experimental storylines (including the use of gimmicks such as flashbacks, dream sequences and split screen) were unsuccessful, and with ratings now at 400,000, it proved that only die-hard fans were still watching.

In 2003, and now with a much reduced cast, storylines focused strongly on Brookside's most popular remaining characters in more self-contained episodes, such as Bev's troubled relationship with her young son Josh (Jack McMullen) and the developing relationship between Jimmy Corkhill and Nikki Shadwick. Nikki had been raped, stalked, held hostage, and her father, brother and sister had all been killed during her time in Brookside Close. With her mother, Margi, now living abroad, she became increasingly dependent on Jimmy and started to see him as a father figure, even agreeing to look after Jimmy so that he could be released from secure psychiatric care. Following the siege, however, she had a brief relationship with the sniper who had rescued her, Matt Henderson (Jamie Lomas), but when that storyline was quickly abandoned during the jarring transition to the 90-minute block format, Nikki began to become romantically interested in Jimmy. After pursuing him for some time, viewers cringed when the two slept together, but knowing a relationship would be impossible, the two resolved to move on. On the rebound, Nikki became involved with Sean Smith (Barry Sloane), Ruth Gordon's ex-husband from across the close, while Jimmy became engaged to Nikki's returned mother Margi (Bernadette Foley). Ultimately though, Jimmy called off the wedding when he suspected he may have lung cancer (although it later transpired to be asbestosis), so Margi jumped on the first plane back to Brussels leaving Nikki all alone at number 6 once again until long running characters Sammy and Katie Rogers eventually moved back to the close as Nikki's lodgers.

Further low-key storylines in the final year of Brookside included following Mike (Paul Byatt) and Rachel Dixon's (Tiffany Chapman) continuous problems with debt before they finally settled down away from the close with their daughter Beth. Long serving character Katie Rogers (Diane Burke) found love with Nic Howard (James Sarsfield) and gave birth to their baby girl, although it was left up to the viewer to decide whether Katie and Nic were eventually married when they left the close for Florida in the closing episodes. Anthony Murray's harrowing bullying storyline was happily resolved and his parents, Marty (Neil Caple) and recently returned real mum Jan (Helen Sheals), eventually reconciled and remarried. Bev and Ron Dixon also got back together, finally forgiving all the problems of their chequered pasts, they gave their relationship another chance and got married, with young Josh (Jack McMullen) completing their happy family. Some viewers were surprised to discover, however, that long-running characters Max and Jacqui Farnham had left Brookside off-screen, with Ron making a scripted, off-hand remark about their departure to a new life in Woolton.

Channel 4 officially announced the end of Brookside on 11 June 2003, and the final episode would be shown just two days after its 21st anniversary in November. The programme was then moved again to what would become its final timeslot, on Tuesdays in a 90-minute format, with times varying but always after 11 pm. The later time slot allowed the soap to introduce scenes of a more darker feel, with bad language being frequently used in the last few episodes. A final story arc, introduced eight weeks before the last episode, saw some of the (off-screen) Brookside Close residents selling-up to a company called Cinerco. The company intended to demolish part of the close for the construction of an access road to a new waste incinerator site. The remaining characters of Brookside Close once again began integrating with each other as they dealt with the reality of losing their homes to the highly contentious plans. Taking full advantage of the new late-night timeslot, the writers reintroduced the raw language frequented in early episodes whilst unmotivated violence and drug abuse could now be seen in abundance. This approach, once again, did nothing to improve the ratings, having now fallen well below 400,000, although during the final six weeks, a rawness and energy previously captured in the very early years made a surprising return with a new character, the despised drug-dealer Jack Michaelson (Paul Duckworth), who moved into the recently vacated number 8. The fact that the entire neighbourhood was about to be demolished was an obvious plot loop hole, but the character nevertheless became the focus of the end of Brookside as all the remaining residents found themselves seriously affected by his destructive presence. Meanwhile, the rest of Brookside Close began to be boarded-up as the other residents started to move away.

The last episode
In the extended final episode, screened at 22:40 and divided into five parts, Brookside shocked the audience one last time with the remaining residents of Brookside Close taking a stand against Michaelson, lynching him from number 8's bedroom window.

Written by creator Phil Redmond, the final episode started exactly the same way episode one had begun 21 years previously, with a milkman delivering provisions to the residents of the close. This time, however, he was greeted with the sight of Jack's dead body hanging from his bedroom window. When the police started investigating, all of the residents on Brookside Close gave false alibis, thus protecting each other from prosecution over Jack's murder. As had been seen in Brookside before, the culprits of the lynching were not revealed, with several characters seen to have the same blue rope with which Jack was hanged. Encouraged by the return of Barry Grant, Tim O'Leary, Steve Murray, and the remaining Gordon lads were all seen contemplating killing Jack, and whilst Jimmy Corkhill was also aware there was a plan, the only male resident in ignorance of what was happening was Ron Dixon. During the darkness of the night, three masked residents broke into Jack's house and suspended him from the front window; however, this is all that was revealed to the audience.

In the last part of the episode, Phil Redmond had his final say in a rebellious scripted rant criticising religion, urban migration, public ignorance and the prohibition of drugs, which was voiced by Brookside's longest-running character, Jimmy, sat in an armchair on the front lawn of number 10. Jimmy was also the last resident of Brookside Close to leave their house. As a last act of defiance, he broke into the abandoned houses and left all the taps running, he then painted Game Over on the boarded-up windows of several houses, and drew an extra D on the Brookside Close sign, to spell Brookside Closed at the end of the episode. He then went to live with his daughter Lindsey Corkhill, who had become engaged to Barry Grant, the two characters having returned especially for the final episode, watched by a peak of 2.27 million viewers.

In the closing narrative, Jimmy and Lindsey went to live in Newcastle in Barry's mansion. Tim moved in with Steve Murray, sharing a flat in Liverpool City Centre, as shown in the Unfinished Business feature. Nikki left for Brussels to live with her mother Margi. The orphaned Gordon children then left with their elder sister Ruth, and her husband Sean Smith, now reunited as head of the remaining Gordon family. Jan, Marty and Anthony Murray followed soon after, refusing to tell anyone where they were going. Bev and Ron Dixon then said their goodbyes to long-time neighbour and archenemy Jimmy Corkhill, with Ron remarking candidly, "I hope I never see you again." The final shot in Brookside was a close-up of Jimmy Corkhill looking directly into the camera and, breaking the fourth wall, winking to the audience. A caption stated, "The End of an Era...".

Theme music and opening titles
The distinctive synthesised theme to Brookside was written by local composers Steve Wright and Dave Roylance from Wirral. Roylance died in October 2006. This version was used on the programme on 2 November 1982, the day the first episode was broadcast, and lasted until 28 December 1990.

With the advent of Dolby Stereo surround sound, the theme was updated and modernised by Wright, and the first episode to feature this music was broadcast on 31 December 1990. This version was the longest-running, and the last time this music was featured on the credits originally aired 31 October 2002.

The third version of the Brookside theme launched on 6 November 2002, a year before the programme was cancelled. A new arrangement at the start of this theme, again by Wright, makes this version of the theme distinctive, although the midsection and close remained similar to the previous versions.

Brookside had memorable opening titles, which subtly changed many times over 21 years, particularly as the residents of Brookside Close came and went. The beginning of the sequence contained sweeping high shots of Liverpool life and landmarks, before showing a bird's-eye view of the estate leading to Brookside Close. Several views of the various residents' homes were shown, before the camera finally settled by the iconic Brookside Close sign. In the early episodes, Bobby Grant's blue Princess was always predominantly parked outside number 5, and in 1990, this became Frank Rogers' purple Ford Cortina when the Rogers replaced the Grants as the family occupying number 5. When Brookside Parade became part of the programme in 1991, shots of the Parade were regularly spliced into the title sequence as businesses came and went – these shots were shown after the existing landmark shots of Liverpool, but before the birds-eye views of Brookside Close and residents' homes.

The closing credits were originally scrolled against a royal blue background, however, this backdrop was soon changed to an aerial view of Brookside Close from episode 105 in 1983. The titles were originally transparent, but this changed to a bold typeface of the same font in 1987. The closing sequence was slightly changed on 7 October 1991 and lasted until 31 December 1993. The closing sequence was changed entirely, giving a bird's-eye view of the close, which was used from 3 January 1994 and lasted until 25 June 1999.

In 1999, the titles were completely changed, and new shots were composed to fit into a split-screen box effect – these titles were specifically designed to reflect the programme's newly launched website. Early versions of this sequence followed a cyclist through the close to Brookside Parade in one box, while the other box contained Steadicam shots approaching each door to the houses on Brookside Close. At the end of each episode until the end of the series, there would be a Next time on Brookside continuity announcement with a preview of scenes from the next episode. This opening title-sequence launched on 29 June 1999.

The final set of opening titles launched on 6 November 2002. Again, following a split screen effect, one half of the (same) shot is presented in daylight, and the other half during night-time. Totally new shots were filmed for this title-sequence and it lasted until the final episode in 2003. These credits were often preceded by the strains of theme song and a Previously on Brookside... comment by various actors during a recap of previous episodes. The series finale's end credits music was cut off at the last portion by the closing of the original Grange Hill theme.

Unlike other British soap operas past or present, at the end of omnibus editions screened at Christmas (usually the last omnibus that year), the cast of actors and crew would stand waving at the camera for the entire duration of the closing credits, wishing all Brookside viewers a 'Happy Christmas'.

Soap bubbles
Two "soap bubbles" were produced in the late 1980s. Damon and Debbie (1987) followed the two characters, Damon Grant and Debbie McGrath absconding to York, concluding in Damon's death. The second, 1988's South, saw Tracy Corkhill and Jamie Henderson seeking a better life in London; this was part of ITV Schools The English Programme and was notable for featuring a guest appearance by Morrissey playing himself.

Both series were written by Frank Cottrell-Boyce, who regularly wrote for the parent programme from 1986 to 1989.

Broadcasting
From its launch in 1982, Brookside was broadcast between 8pm and 9pm, although some episodes would occasionally be shown at 9pm or after for scheduling reasons. In Wales, S4C always screened Brookside at 10pm. The Omnibus was broadcast on Saturday evening, usually at 5pm6pm.

During weekdays, Brookside was always broadcast from 8pm, first on Tuesday and Wednesday, then Monday and Wednesday, with a few special five-nighters, with these episodes always airing Monday to Friday.

On 1 July 1990, as ratings increased, Brookside gained a third weekly episode, which saw a regular broadcast pattern of Monday, Wednesday and Friday at 8pm. The serial's timeslot was far more consistent in the 1980s and early 1990s, however, from the mid-1990s, the schedules did keep changing. In 1994, when the BBC's soap EastEnders started broadcasting three nights a week, the third weekly episodes was broadcast every Monday at 8pm, which clashed with Brookside. This forced Channel 4 to move Brookside to Tuesdays at 8pm (initially up against ITV's The Bill). The final weekday schedule, from 2001, was Wednesday, Thursday and Friday at 8pm.

From 30 November 2002, as a consequence of declining ratings over the previous five years, it was removed from its traditional weekday timeslots and reduced to a 90-minute edition broadcast once a week on Saturday evening, usually from 4pm. By now, it was being widely reported in the media that Brookside was likely to be axed completely within the next year.

On 27 July 2003, by which time Channel 4 bosses had confirmed that it would be discontinued later in the year, Brookside was moved to its final broadcast time of Tuesdays, usually starting after 11pm, but on at least one occasion the show did not start until after midnight for scheduling reasons. The final episode was 100 minutes including adverts and screened slightly earlier, from 10:40pm to 12:20am.

Repeats
 Living (then called UK Living, later Sky Living, and now known as Sky Witness) repeated Brookside from episode 1, commencing 13 February 1995 until September 2001. Originally, episodes were screened at 6.30pm, and repeated that evening at 11pm. By 2000, however, it was only being aired in a morning slot, usually at 9.30 am.
 Sky One took over the repeat rights to Brookside from episode 1475. It was shown at 10:30am and started with episodes that originally aired on Channel 4 in October 1994. However, in 2002 this was changed to an early-morning 3:30am timeslot, before being dropped completely in June, ending with episode 1795, which was originally broadcast in October 1996.
 No episodes from late 1996, through to the final episode in 2003, have ever been repeated on any British TV channel although two episodes from both 1998 and 2002 were released on the 30th Anniversary DVD.
 From February 2023, the entire series is being made available free to view on STV Player.

Scheduling history
1982–1990: Twice a week (30-minute episodes)
 Tuesday & Wednesday: Week commencing 31 October 1982 – 17 November 1984
 Monday & Wednesday: Week commencing 18 November 1984 – 29 December 1984, 31 July 1988 – 30 June 1990
 Monday & Tuesday: Week commencing 30 December 1984 – 30 July 1988

1990–2002: Three nights a week (30-minute episodes)
 Monday, Wednesday & Friday: Week commencing 1 July 1990 – 30 April 1994
 Tuesday, Wednesday & Friday: Week commencing 1 May 1994 – 15 December 2001
 Wednesday, Thursday & Friday: Week commencing 16 December 2001 – 23 November 2002

2002–2003: Once a week (90-minute episode)
 Saturday: Week commencing 30 November 2002 – 5 April 2003, 13 April 2003 – 19 July 2003
 Thursday: Week commencing 6 April 2003 – 12 April 2003
 Tuesday: Week commencing 27 July 2003 – 8 November 2003

Merchandise

Video releases
Brookside was one of the first British soap operas to have classic episodes released on video. In 1990, Channel 4 and Mersey Television released a series of videos showcasing some of Brookside's most memorable episodes and characters of the 1980s:

Brookside Classics Volume One: The Siege: This video, released in 1989 contained three episodes and brought together the gripping 'number 7 Siege' as an extended omnibus edition of 75 minutes. These episodes originally aired in July 1985.

Brookside Classics Volume Two: The Sheila Grant Years: The much-loved character Sheila Grant, played by Sue Johnston, was the subject of the second video release in 1989. Sheila's rape ordeal was featured, alongside a night out with Jimmy's then girlfriend Kathy Roach (Noreen Kershaw).

Brookside Classics Volume Three: That Man Harry Cross: The third video released in 1989 included three classic episodes featuring the popular character Harry Cross played by Bill Dean. This video contained memories of his time in Brookside Close with his wife Edna (Betty Alberge) and, later, his old friend Ralph Hardwick (Ray Dunbobbin).

Brookside: The Teenagers: A later release, from 1995, documents the teenage characters in Brookside including Beth Jordache (Anna Friel), Margaret Clemence (Nicola Stephenson), Damon Grant (Simon O'Brien) and Katie Rogers (Diane Burke).

Brookside: The Women: Also released in 1995, this video brought together the most popular female characters in the soap, including Mandy Jordache (Sandra Maitland), Sue Sullivan (Annie Miles) and Deborah 'D.D' Dixon (Irene Marot).

Brookside: The Men: Released two years after The Women video, similarly, The Men contained previously unseen footage and interviews with actors documenting the long-suffering male characters of Brookside Close.

In the late 1990s, there were several videos that contained extensions of plots that began in Brookside on-screen, or gave viewers a chance to see their favourite Brookside actors behind-the-scenes or outside their usual roles in the soap:

Brookside: The Lost Weekend: A feature-length episode of Brookside reuniting characters old and new. This feature-length episode from 1997 detailed the reunion of Sheila and Barry Grant (Sue Johnston and Paul Usher) in an action-packed continuation of a storyline, which began in the regular editions of the soap on Channel 4.

Brookside: The Backstage Tour: A behind-the-scenes documentary released in 1997, with the only opportunity to view the 'alternative' ending to the infamous Body Under The Patio Trial from 1995, where Beth and Mandy are proven not guilty of murdering Trevor.

Brookside: Friday the 13th: A dramatic storyline for selected characters of the television soap. Here, we are able to view Lindsey Corkhill's (Claire Sweeney) 'missing' journey to her wedding to Peter Phelan (Samuel Kane), as well as another appearance from Sheila Grant (Sue Johnston) and a cameo from Harry Cross (Bill Dean). It was released in 1998.

Brookside: Double Take: In 1999, this unusual video saw members of the Brookside and Hollyoaks casts playing alternative characters in a spoof-documentary style feature.

DVD releases
When it was announced that the show would be finishing as a continuing series in 2003, on Brookside's official website, there was a suggestion by Phil Redmond that Brookside would continue with a succession of DVD releases. In fact, as early as 1988, Hilary Kingsley interviewed Redmond for her book, Soap Box, and even then, he confidently suggested that if Brookside were to end on Channel 4, he would attempt to continue the show off-screen:

The first DVD after the final episode featured the climax to a long-running storyline involving Tim "Tinhead" O'Leary and Steve Murray finally getting revenge on Terry 'Psycho' Gibson in an 85-minute feature called Unfinished Business. Psycho killed Tim's wife Emily during the November 2002 siege, and Steve's stepmother, Diane (Bernie Nolan), died in the subsequent helicopter crash on Brookside Parade. The DVD was released in November 2003 to generally poor reviews. There was meant to be a follow-up DVD release involving a storyline with Barry Grant tracking down his brother Damon's killers, a story arc vaguely referenced during Brookside's final episode on Channel 4. A trail for a DVD-film called Settlin' Up was filmed and included in the Unfinished Business extras. Simon O'Brien was slated to appear as Damon Grant's ghost, and it is believed that although scenes were shot for the Settlin' Up promotional trail, the actual feature did not make the production stages.

Also included as an extra was promo for a 21st-anniversary documentary called Brookside: 100 Greatest Moments. A heavily cut-down version of this documentary also appeared, called Brookside: 10 of the Best. Whilst recognising the existence of the Most Memorable Moments DVD, containing 16 Episodes and was released on 26 November 2012.

After Brookside

When Brookside was removed from prime-time Channel 4, Mersey Television immediately started using some of the houses on Brookside Close in its other soaps Hollyoaks and Grange Hill. In Hollyoaks, the Dean family moved into what was number 7 Brookside Close, and the Burton-Taylor family moved into what was number 8 (as a result, the interior of number 8 was never again seen in Brookside with its occupant, Jack Michaelson, only ever shown at the door of the house). On-screen, the two identical houses had their exteriors clad in a mock-Tudor wood effect, net curtains covered the windows, and there were never exterior long-shots, but eagle-eyed viewers frequently spotted sights and props that made the use of these houses in Hollyoaks fairly obvious. In fact, prior to the use of these houses as sets, another house in Brookside Close was also used in Hollyoaks as the Cunninghams' home. However, although this would have been number 13 Brookside Close had it appeared on-screen, the house was never featured in any Brookside storyline and was never seen or referenced.

Following the sale of Mersey Television to All3Media in June 2005, all the properties on Brookside Close became surplus to requirements so all the Hollyoaks characters based at this set quickly transferred to new homes at Mersey Television's Childwall site. The entire set was sold to a developer who then stripped, gutted, and attempted to rebuild the entire interior of each of the 13 houses before making them available for sale to the public in January 2007. Of the houses on Brookside Close that were used as sets, numbers 7 and 8 were the cheapest at £199,000, while the famous number 10 was for sale at £295,000 according to the particulars of Off Plan Investments, which was selling the houses at that time. The houses were put up for sale in a semi-finished condition, and coupled with the extremely high asking prices, they did not sell; the developer went into receivership soon after. The set then became neglected and fell into decay.

In February 2008, it was revealed by the auctioneers SHM Smith Hodgkinson that it would be taking offers for the 13 houses, considering bids in the region of £2 million.

In 2008, Brookside Close was once again used as a production set; a local production company was given special permission to use the close, but this time for a low-budget horror film called Salvage. The film received modest reviews but was not widely distributed – and, despite the best efforts of the set designers, some reviewers did comment: "it looks like it's been filmed in Brookside Close".

It was reported in November 2008 that the 13 properties were to be auctioned off collectively, with a guide price of £550,000–£600,000. There was speculation at this time that the series may be resurrected as Dean Sullivan, who played Jimmy Corkhill, had himself attempted to purchase the close to revive Brookside. However, an unnamed Liverpool-based buyer purchased all 13 properties on 17 December 2008 for £735,000, although by this time the close was in a state of severe disrepair, and speculation mounted as to what would happen to the disintegrating properties.

In February 2011, after years of building work, Brookside Close was revived and returned to its former glory. Over the period of three years, each house was restored from what was technically an individual film set, to a real home, fit for real-life occupancy. Now aligned and fully integrated into the housing estate that has always surrounded it, Brookside Close is now simply Brookside (odd numbers: 43–67) and real residents now occupy the houses, making it unlikely that the houses will be used in film or television production again.

In 2021, actor Ray Quinn, known for his role as Anthony Murray in Brookside from 2000 to 2003, announced that he had begun a new career laying carpets at his family firm during the Coronavirus pandemic, with one of his first jobs being laying carpets in the renovated houses on Brookside Close.

In popular culture
Idle Gossip, a 1986 album by punk rock band Toy Dolls, referred to the popular characters Harry and Edna Cross (Bill Dean and Betty Alberge) in one of the album's tracks, which was entitled "Harry Cross: A Tribute to Edna". The album was released the year after Edna's on-screen death.

Liverpudlian professional wrestler Robbie Brookside (real name Robert Brooks) was given his ring name by promoter Brian Dixon as a reference to Brookside, which began airing two years before Robbie's wrestling debut. His daughter Xia Brookside has also taken the ring name.

See also
 List of Brookside characters

References

General

 
 
 
 
 Brookside: Ten of the Best, 30-minute documentary included on the DVD release Brookside: Unfinished Business. FHED1759.

Specific

Further reading
Braverman, Rachel (1995) Beth Jordache, the New Journals; adapted from Phil Redmond's Brookside by Rachel Braverman. London: Boxtree

External links

 Museum of Broadcast Communications, detailed account of the career of Phil Redmond, the creator of Brookside
 Channel 4 archive Brookside web page
 When soaps die, article about cancelled British soap operas, including an extensive look at the demise of Brookside
 
 Satellite view of Brookside Close
 
 

 
1982 British television series debuts
2003 British television series endings
1980s British television soap operas
1990s British television soap operas
2000s British television soap operas
Channel 4 television dramas
Social realism
Gay-related television shows
Lesbian-related television shows
British television soap operas
Television shows set in Liverpool
English-language television shows
Rape in television
Television series by All3Media